Fort Corchaug Archeological Site is a prehistoric archaeological site in Cutchogue on eastern Long Island in New York State.  It is located west of the North Fork Country Club, on the south side of Main Road (New York State Route 25).  The site shows evidence of 17th century contact between Native Americans and Europeans.  Fort Corchaug itself was a log fort built by Native Americans.  It may have been to protect the Corchaug tribe from other Indians, built with the help of Europeans.    Ralph Solecki, a prominent American archaeologist, grew up nearby and conducted several digs on site.

It remains today one of the few undisturbed Native American fortified village sites in the North East. and was declared a National Historic Landmark in 1999.  The  property where the fort is located is protected in part by a conservation easement owned by a local land trust, and is in part owned by the town of Southold as a nature preserve.  Known as the Downs Farm Preserve, it is open to the public with hiking trails.

The Corchaug tribe, also known as the Montaukett, originally had the land from the Nassau border to Montauk Point. Depradation by the Narragansetts of Connecticut and decimation from smallpox caused to tribe to leave their land in the South Fork and with the help of whites built forts to ward off attacks. Another fort still being excavated is Fort Hill (now in Montauk County Park) in Montauk Point, described as "one of the earliest and best for its time", it was placed on a 1658 map of Long Island.

References

National Historic Landmarks in New York (state)
Archaeological sites in New York (state)
Geography of Suffolk County, New York
National Register of Historic Places in Suffolk County, New York
Southold, New York